Lincoln Regional Airport may refer to:

 Lincoln Regional Airport (California) in Lincoln, California, United States (FAA: LHM)
 Lincoln Regional Airport (Maine) in Lincoln, Maine, United States (FAA: LRG)

See also
 Lincoln Airport (disambiguation)
 Lincoln County Airport (disambiguation)
 Lincoln Municipal Airport (disambiguation)